Albert Wesley "Al" Johnson  (October 18, 1923 – November 9, 2010) was a Canadian civil servant, former president of the Canadian Broadcasting Corporation, professor in the department of political science at the University of Toronto, and author.

Born in Insinger, Saskatchewan, he received a Master's in public administration (MPA) from the University of Toronto and an MPA and a PhD from Harvard University. He was deputy treasurer of Saskatchewan from 1952 until 1964. Johnson was one of the key figures in the development of universal medicare, first in Saskatchewan in the governments of Premier Tommy Douglas and Premier Woodrow Lloyd and subsequently at the national level.  In 1964 he became assistant deputy minister of finance for the federal government. From 1975 until 1982 he was president of the CBC. He subsequently taught at Queen's University and the University of Toronto.

In 1980 he was made an Officer of the Order of Canada and was promoted to Companion in 1996 in recognition of his "outstanding career as a public servant, university professor and consultant on post-secondary education, social policy and public management both nationally and internationally".

Johnson wrote the 2004 book Dream No Little Dreams, A Biography of the Douglas Government of Saskatchewan, 1944–1961 for which he was awarded the Canadian Political Science Association's Donald Smiley Prize in 2005.

After leaving the federal civil service he embarked on an international career:

 Special Advisor on National Provincial Fiscal Arrangements for the International Monetary Fund 1988
 Head of Mission on Administrative Modernization for the Canadian International Development Agency 1991
 Senior advisor to South Africa/Canada Program on Governance 1992
 Commissioner of South Africa's Presidential Review Commission on the Public Service 1996

Returning to Canada in 1999, Johnson became special chair in public policy to the Government of Saskatchewan.

Johnson died in Ottawa at age 87. He was survived by his wife, Ruth (née Hardy), whom he married in 1946, four children and one granddaughter.

CBC years 
During Johnson's years as President of the CBC, his chief goal was the Canadianization of the airwaves, by increasing the quality and quantity of Canadian radio and television programming.

Awards and honours
 Vanier Medal 1976
 Companion of the Order of Canada 1997
 Canadian Political Science Association, Donald Smiley Prize 2005
 Arthur Kroeger College of Public Affairs, Award for Ethics in Public Affairs 2010
 The Johnson Shoyama Graduate School of Public Policy, established jointly between the University of Regina and the University of Saskatchewan in 2007, was named in honour of Johnson and Thomas Shoyama.

References

1923 births
2010 deaths
Canadian political scientists
20th-century Canadian historians
Canadian male non-fiction writers
20th-century Canadian civil servants
Harvard Kennedy School alumni
Companions of the Order of Canada
Writers from Saskatchewan
University of Toronto alumni
Academic staff of the University of Toronto
Presidents of the Canadian Broadcasting Corporation